Bispo may refer to:

People:
Daniel Bispo (born 1974), boxer from Brazil
Diego Andrade Silva Bispo (born 1989), Brazilian defender
Rodolfo Dantas Bispo (born 1982), versatile Brazilian footballer who played defender
Rogério Bispo (born 1985), Brazilian long jumper
Pedro Bispo Moreira Junior (born 1987), Brazilian striker
Adriano Bispo dos Santos (born 1987), defensive midfielder
Jose Bispo Clementino dos Santos (1913–2008), Brazilian samba singer known as Jamelão

Places:
Nossa Senhora do Bispo (Montemor-o-Novo), Portuguese civil parish in the municipality of Montemor-o-Novo
Sagres (Vila do Bispo), town located in the municipality of Vila do Bispo, Algarve, Portugal
Santa Catarina da Fonte do Bispo, freguesia (parish) in the municipality of Tavira (Algarve, Portugal)
Vila do Bispo Municipality, municipality in Portugal

See also
Bespoke
Bishpool
Bispøyan
Obispo (disambiguation)
Vispop